Paseo de los Lagos is a lake and public path located in the city of Xalapa in Veracruz state in eastern Mexico. It was once the site of an ancient dam. The lake has a fresh-water spring and is surrounded by footpaths.

References

External links
YouTube video

Xalapa
Lakes of Mexico
Landforms of Veracruz